Cynthia Wu (born 18 May 1978) is a Taiwanese business executive and politician. She worked for subsidiaries of Merrill Lynch in the United Kingdom and the Shin Kong Group in Taiwan before she was appointed to the Legislative Yuan in 2022.

Personal life, education, and early career
Cynthia Wu was born in the United States on 18 May 1978, and attended Taipei American School, Wellesley College and The Courtauld Institute of Art. She is the eldest daughter of Eugene Wu and his wife Hsu Hsien-hsien. Her maternal grandfather is banker and politician Hsu Sheng-fa. Cynthia Wu's younger sister is Wu Hsin-ju, and her younger brother is Wu Yi-tung. While living in the United Kingdom, Wu worked for Merrill Lynch in London. Her uncles Eric and Thomas Wu are also business executives, and Eric Wu had previously served on the Legislative Yuan.

Cynthia Wu married , an executive at Hua Nan Securities, in 2010. In September 2013, Wu noticed that Lin, who suspected her of infidelity, had installed a GPS tracking unit in her car, and subsequently filed for divorce. Lin was acquitted in the first ruling, and the divorce was not granted. Although a second ruling in 2019 granted the divorce, Wu stated that the decision would deny her the experience of motherhood, as embryos that had been artificially inseminated during her marriage to Lin would be destroyed.

Wu married Renaud van der Elst in 2022, and she gave birth to their son on February 9, 2023.

Political career
While residing in the UK, Cynthia Wu was an assistant to Conservative Party politician Peter Lilley. She was ranked seventh on the Taiwan People's Party list prior to the 2020 Taiwanese legislative election. After the resignation of Tsai Pi-ru, Wu was appointed to the 10th Legislative Yuan on 2 November 2022.

References

1978 births
Living people
Wellesley College alumni
Alumni of the Courtauld Institute of Art
Taiwan People's Party Members of the Legislative Yuan
21st-century Taiwanese women politicians
Taiwanese women business executives
Party List Members of the Legislative Yuan
Members of the 10th Legislative Yuan
21st-century Taiwanese businesspeople
Taiwanese expatriates in the United States
20th-century Taiwanese businesspeople
Taiwanese expatriates in the United Kingdom
Merrill (company) people